Rožina is a village situated in Merošina municipality in Serbia. According to the census of 2002, there were 753 people (according to the census of 1991, there were 805 inhabitants).

Demographics 
In Rožina, there are 612 adult residents, and the average age is 43.4 years (41.9 for males and 45.0 for females). The village has 215 households, and the average number of members per household is 3.50. It is largely populated by Serbs (according to 2002 census), and in the last three censuses, noticed a decline in population.

References

Populated places in Nišava District